Tindar is a ridge made by subglacial volcanism. It can contain pillow lava, pillow breccia, hyalotuff, hyaloclastite. Examples are Skefilfjall, Kálfstindar, Helgafell in Iceland and Pillow Ridge in British Columbia.

References

Volcanology